Pavel Aleksandrovich Zubov (born 4 February 1988) is a former Russian professional football player.

Club career
He played in the Russian Football National League for FC Irtysh Omsk in 2010.

External links
 
 
 

1988 births
Sportspeople from Omsk
Living people
Russian footballers
FC Spartak Moscow players
Association football midfielders
FC Zenit Saint Petersburg players
FC Irtysh Omsk players
FK Žalgiris players
A Lyga players
Russian expatriate footballers
Expatriate footballers in Lithuania
FC Sportakademklub Moscow players